Queijada is a type of sweet made most famously in Sintra, Portugal. It is a small sweet prepared using cheese or requeijão, eggs, milk, and powdered sugar. Other queijadas are produced in Madeira, Azores, Oeiras, Évora and Pereira (Montemor-o-Velho).

See also
 List of desserts

References

Portuguese desserts
Cheese dishes
Custard desserts
Egg dishes